Nojubaran (also Romanized as Nojūbarān; also known as Nūjbarān and Nujubarān) is a village in Cham Chamal Rural District, Bisotun District, Harsin County, Kermanshah Province, Iran. At the 2006 census, its population was 445, in 107 families.

References 

Populated places in Harsin County